Scarlett is a 2018 Italian thriller film directed by Luigi Boccia.

Cast

Release
The film premiered at Rome Independent Film Festival on 22 November 2018. It was released on Prime Video on 1 February 2022.

References

External links

2018 films
2018 thriller films
Italian thriller films
Films about automobiles
2010s Italian films